Joghanab-e Sofla (also Romanized as Joghanāb-e Soflá; also known as Jeghanāb Pā’īn and Joghanāb-e Pā’īn) is a village in Peyghan Chayi Rural District, in the Central District of Kaleybar County, East Azerbaijan Province, Iran. At the 2006 census, its population was 125, in 29 families.

References 

Populated places in Kaleybar County